National Route 9 (in Spanish, Ruta Nacional PY09, better known as Ruta Transchaco) is a national highway in Paraguay, which crosses the Paraguayan Chaco, crossing the departments of Presidente Hayes, and Boquerón. It starts at the Argentinian border in José Falcón and ends at the Bolivian border in Fortín Sgto. Rodríguez, traversing .

It is important to note that the last , or so, of the route from Asunción to the Bolivian border which is shown on the accompanying map, no longer represents the de facto highway between Paraguay and Bolivia. Coming from Asunción the actual asphalt highway turns left (south-west) at a place on Ruta 9 called Estancia La Patria (  ). From there , or so, of good quality gravel road leads to the first substantial Bolivian town, Villamontes.

Distances and important cities 

The following table shows the distances traversed by PY09 in each different department, and important cities that it passes by (or near).

References

9
Boquerón Department
Central Department
Presidente Hayes Department